Exotica Volume II was the second album by Martin Denny, released in 1958.

Track listing

 "Soshu Night Serenade" (Ryōichi Hattori) – 2:08
 "Island of Dreams" (Laine, Denny) – 2:53
 "Japanese Farewell Song (Sayonara)" (Yoshda, Morgan) – 2:21
 "Singing Bamboos" (Madeline Lamb) – 2:07
 "The Queen Chant (E Lili Ua E)" (John Kaladana) – 2:46
 "Wedding Song" (Ke Kali Ne Au) (Charles E. King) – 2:44
 "Escales" (Jacques Ibert) – 2:39
 "When First I Love" (Denny) – 2:22
 "August Bells" (Gil Baumgart, Denny) – 2:14
 "Bacoa" (Les Baxter) – 1:59
 "Ebb Tide" (Robert Maxwell) – 3:11
 "Rush Hour in Hong Kong" (Abram Chasins) – 1:58

Personnel 
 Martin Denny – piano, celeste, arrangements
 Arthur Lyman – vibes, marimba, xylophone, percussion
 Augie Colon – bongos, congas, Latin effects, bird calls
 Bernard Miller – string bass
 Jack Shoop – alto flute, baritone saxophone
 Roy Harte – drums, percussion
 Gil Baumgart – arranger, percussion
 Si Waronker – producer
 Ted Keep – engineer
 Val Valentin – engineer (uncredited)
 Garrett-Howard – cover design
 Sandy Warner – cover model

References

1958 albums
Exotica albums
Martin Denny albums
Liberty Records albums
Albums produced by Simon Waronker
Albums arranged by Martin Denny